Arthur Clayton (1902–1955) was a British film actor. He mainly appeared in American films during the silent and early sound era.

Selected filmography
 The Hope (1920)
 In Folly's Trail  (1920)
 The Hope Diamond Mystery (1921)
 The Mistress of Shenstone (1921)
 Be My Wife (1921)
 Laddie (1926)
 The Better 'Ole (1926)
 Outlaws of Red River (1927)
 Confessions of a Wife (1928)
 The Whip (1928)
 The Black Watch (1929)
 Three Live Ghosts (1929)
 Girl of the Port (1930)
 The Road to Singapore (1931)
 Stingaree (1934)
 White Heat (1934)
 Green Eyes (1934)
 Charlie Chan in London (1934)
 Crimson Romance (1934)
 Marie Galante (1934)
 The Deputy Drummer (1935)
 Everything Is Rhythm (1936)

References

Bibliography
 Munden, Kenneth White. The American Film Institute Catalog of Motion Pictures Produced in the United States, Part 1. University of California Press, 1997.

External links

1902 births
1955 deaths
English male film actors
English male silent film actors
Male actors from London